Rura is a Nagar Panchayat in Kanpur Dehat District in Uttar Pradesh state of the India. The town is situated on the banks of Lower Ganga canal. The district headquarters is 15 km away at Mati.
The town is located at a distance of 49 km from famous industrial and educational hub of Kanpur Nagar.

Education

 R P S Inter College
 C.D.Girls Inter College 
 Pt.O.P.Sharma Degree College.
 Janka Devi Degree College

Places of interest
Waneshwar Mahadev Temple
Parhul Devi Temple (Lamahra)
Durga Temple (city heart)
Patha Mai Temple
Bala ji Temple (Dhanirampur-Rura)
Shiv Bajrang Dham Kishunpur
Bajrang Temple Tanki Talab
Town Church (Power house Rura)

Transport
Rura  Railway Station is on the Delhi-Howrah rail route. It is a major station between Etawah and Kanpur central. It lies on the North Central railway zone.
To the east, Roshan Mau Halt Station (8 km) is the nearest station. Going west, Ambiyapur (9 km) is the next station.
Kanpur Central Railway Station is the nearest major railway station. 
Rura Bus Stand : Rura bus stand is situated at Akbarpur Road and Derapur Road meet point. People can get bus for Akbarpur, Raniya, Fazalganj, Ramadevi and Galuwapur, Derapur Route. Bus is also available to Mangalpur via Derapur, Nonari & Dilval.

Another bus stand at canal bridge, From where people may get bus to Sheoli, Kalyanpur & Kanpur, and other route to Billhaur via Jhinjhak, Rasulabad and another to Bilhaur via Banipara, Minda ka Kunwa.
Besides passenger trains following are main trains:
Main Express Trains
Gomti Express (super fast).
Agra-Lucknow Intercity Express (super fast).
Rourkela/Tata Nagar Jammu Tawi Muri Express .
Unchahar Express .
Sangam Express  (up) .
Toofan Express.
Mahananda Express.
Following are the main passenger trains:

 04192 (Phaphund - Kanpur Central MEMU)
 04188 (Tundla - Kanpur Central MEMU)
 04187 (Kanpur Central - Tundla MEMU)
 04191 (Kanpur Central - Phaphund MEMU)

Geography
It has an average elevation of 127 metres (416 feet).

Demographics
 India census, Rura had a population of 35,206. Males constitute 53% of the population and females 47%. Rura has an average literacy rate of 70%, lower than the national average of 75%: male literacy is 75%, and female literacy is 65%. In Rura, 14% of the population is under 6 years of age.

Gallery

References

Cities and towns in Kanpur Dehat district